Euurobracon yokahamae is a species of wasp in the family Braconidae. It was described by Karl Wilhelm von Dalla Torre in 1898.

Distribution 
This species is distributed in Eastern Asia, Laos, Thailand and India.

References 

Insects described in 1898
Hymenoptera of Asia
Braconidae